The Convent of Saint George was a convent of Benedictine nuns located in Prague Castle in Bohemia (now the Czech Republic) between 973 and 1782.

Founded in 973, the convent was next to the seat of ecclesiastical and state power in Bohemia and occasionally the entire Holy Roman Empire, and played an important historical role.  Although no longer active, the convent's building and the attached Basilica dedicated to Saint George still exist. The building of the convent housed the Czech National Gallery's collection of 19th-century Bohemian art for a long time. Currently, it is empty and waits for a renovation.

The Abbess of this convent had the unusual privilege of crowning  the Queen consort of Bohemia, inherited in 1782 by the Princess-Abbess of the Theresian Institution of Noble Ladies.

References

Benedictine monasteries in the Czech Republic
Prague Castle
Buildings and structures in Prague
Order of Saint Benedict
973 establishments
10th-century establishments in Bohemia
Benedictine nunneries
1782 disestablishments in the Habsburg monarchy
1782 disestablishments in the Holy Roman Empire